The British-American Institute of Science and Industry was a school started in 1842 by Josiah Henson near Dresden, Western District, Canada West, Province of Canada, as part of the Dawn Settlement, a community of fugitive slaves who had escaped to Canada. The institute was a school for all ages designed to provide a general education and teacher training. For a short period it was a manual labor school. It was taken over by the British and Foreign Anti-Slavery Society in 1849. The school closed down in 1868. The site of the school is encompassed today by the Uncle Tom's Cabin Historic Site.

References

Schools in Ontario
1868 disestablishments
Educational institutions established in 1842
Fugitive American slaves
American manual labor schools